Preminchi Choodu may refer to:
 Preminchi Choodu (1965 film), an Indian Telugu-language romantic comedy film
 Preminchi Choodu (1989 film), a Telugu-language comedy film